Edward A. Bayer is an American-Israeli scientist.

Early life 
Edward A. Bayer was born on January 4, 1947, in Detroit, Michigan, US to Adele A. and Harmon S. Bayer.
Edward (“Ed” or “Eddie”) spent most of his primary school years in a predominantly Jewish northwest Detroit neighborhood, where so many of his fellow Baby Boomers lived. Here his Jewish identity, and other aspects of his identity, was established. The eldest of four siblings, two brothers (Gerald E. and Charles S.) and later a sister (Irene S.), he demonstrated many talents at an early age by organizing creative games, baseball competitions, productions, nature outings and other diversions. His interest in science and animals was formed early as exhibited by many excursions with his brothers into the "wilds".  When his family moved to the Detroit suburb of West Bloomfield, his first year in Junior High School, Ed continued his creative pursuits. Demonstrating remarkable artistic tendencies even as a toddler, he used his skills to produce a puppet show, designing and creating by hand all the puppets and guiding his brothers in every aspect of the production. 
Ed was known in High School as a jokester and often combined this with his love of Science, and repeatedly topped his Chemistry teacher by proving him wrong in a funny and delicate way.

Education
He graduated with B.Sc. and M. Sc. in Zoology and Biology in University of Michigan and Wayne State University. He immigrated to Israel in 1971. He then graduated a Ph.D. in biophysics from the Weizmann Institute of Science, under the supervision of Meir Wilchek. Edward A. Bayer became a professor in the Weizmann Institute of Science in 2001 and published over 400 scientific papers in reputed journals. He is a member of the Scientific Advisory Board, of US-Department of Energy BioEnergy Science Center (BESC) since 2008 and of the Israel VATAT Planning and Budgeting Committee: National Subcommittee on "Energy & the Environment" and also serves as editor in several distinguished scientific journals.

Scientific contributions
Edward A. Bayer participated in the development of avidin-biotin technology  (together with Meir Wilchek) that contributed to the field of biorecognition and is intensively used in various biochemical applications, e.g. for affinity chromatography, affinity labeling, affinity therapy and many more.
During his post-doctoral studies at Tel Aviv University, Edward A. Bayer co-discovered the Cellulosome (together with Raphael Lamed Professor at Tel Aviv University), an intricate multi-enzyme complex produced by many cellulolytic anaerobic microorganisms. In 1994, Edward A. Bayer proposed an original concept for the construction of designer cellulosomes, based on the specific affinity between cohesin and dockerin modules from the same bacterial species and type.

These enzymatic complexes are composed of recombinant chimaeric scaffoldins and dockerin-containing enzyme hybrids and serve as nanomolecular tool for the characterization of cellulosomes. The use of designer cellulosome technology for the construction of a consolidated bioprocessing (CBP) organism to will combine enzyme production, cellulose hydrolysis, and fermentation into a single process for the conversion of lignocellulosic waste and biomass to valuables products such as sugars and biofuels has been demonstrated.

Honors and awards

1979-1982	Recipient of NIH National Research Service Award.
1990	Recipient of The Sarstedt Research Award (together with Meir Wilchek) for "development of biotin-avidin systems for biomedical analysis."  Presented by the German Association for Clinical Chemistry (Nümbrecht, Germany).
 1993-1999	Peer-elected to General Council of the International Society for Molecular Recognition.
2002	Elected to Fellowship by the American Academy of Microbiology
2005-2009	Peer-elected to National Council of the Israeli Society of Microbiology
2006	Recipient of The Ulitzky Prize, The Israel Society for Microbiology
2007-2013	Peer-elected to General Council of the International Society for Molecular Recognition.
2013	Invited Member of the European Academy of Microbiologists

References 

1947 births
Living people
American scientists
University of Michigan alumni
Wayne State University alumni
American emigrants to Israel